Validated is an album by Keith Martin, released on March 23, 2004 by the Orchard label. The song "Whateva U Need" was released as a single. This was his last U.S. album to be released during his lifetime.

Track listing

Album credits
Executive Producer: Greg Gali-Rivera 
Producers: Keith Martin, Christopher Thornton, Charles Richards, Kowan "Q" Paul, Jesse Johnson's Revue and others.

References

2004 albums
Keith Martin (musician) albums
Albums produced by Keith Martin (musician)
The Orchard (company) albums